

John Carl Buechler (pronounced Beekler; June 18, 1952 – March 18, 2019) was an American special make-up effects artist, film director, producer, screenwriter, and actor. He was best known for his work on horror and science-fiction films, mostly as part of Charles Band's Empire Pictures, and directed films such as Troll, Friday the 13th Part VII: The New Blood, Cellar Dweller, Ghoulies III: Ghoulies Go to College, and Curse of the Forty-Niner. His make-up work includes Ghoulies, From Beyond, Troll, TerrorVision, Dolls, Prison, A Nightmare on Elm Street 4: The Dream Master, Halloween 4: The Return of Michael Myers, and Hatchet.

After he was diagnosed with Stage IV prostate cancer, his wife set up a GoFundMe page to help pay for medical expenses. Buechler died on March 18, 2019.

Filmography

Special Make-Up Effects
 Dr. Heckyl and Mr. Hype (1980)
 Sorceress (1982)
 Forbidden World (1982)
 The Prey (1983)
 Mausoleum (1983)
 Deathstalker (1983)
 The Dungeonmaster (1984)
 Trancers (1984)
 Re-Animator (1985)
 Ghoulies (1985)
 Troll (1986)
 Eliminators (1986)
 TerrorVision (1986)
 From Beyond (1986)
 Dolls (1987)
 Ghoulies II (1987)
 Prison (1987)
 Cellar Dweller (1988)
 Friday the 13th Part VII: The New Blood (1988)
 A Nightmare on Elm Street 4: The Dream Master (1988)
 Halloween 4: The Return of Michael Myers (1988)
 Arena (1989)
 Robot Jox (1989)
 Bride of Re-Animator (1990)
 Ghoulies III: Ghoulies Go to College (1991)
 Freddy's Dead: The Final Nightmare (1991)
 Demonic Toys (1992) uncredited
 Carnosaur (1993)
 Carnosaur 2 (1995)
 Project Metalbeast (1995)
 Halloween: The Curse of Michael Myers (1995)
 Watchers Reborn (1998)
 A Light in the Forest (2002)
 Deep Freeze (2002)
 Curse of the Forty-Niner (2002)
 Grandpa's Place (2004)
 The Gingerdead Man (2005)
 Saurian (2006)
 Hatchet (2006)
 The Strange Case of Dr. Jekyll and Mr. Hyde (2006)
 Gingerdead Man 2: Passion of the Crust (2008)

Director
 The Dungeonmaster (1984)
 Troll (1986)
 Cellar Dweller (1988)
 Friday the 13th Part VII: The New Blood (1988)
 Ghoulies III: Ghoulies Go to College (1991)
 Watchers Reborn (1998)
 A Light in the Forest (2002)
 Deep Freeze (2002)
 Curse of the Forty-Niner (2002)
 Grandpa's Place (2004)
 Saurian (2006)
 The Strange Case of Dr. Jekyll and Mr. Hyde (2006)
 The Eden Formula (2006)
 Dark Star Hollow (2011)
 Under ConTroll (2019)

Producer
 Deep Freeze (2002)

Writer
The Dungeonmaster (1984)
Troll (1986) (uncredited)
Demonwarp (1988) (story)
 A Light in the Forest (2002)
Saurian (2006)
The Eden Formula (2006)
 The Strange Case of Dr. Jekyll and Mr. Hyde (2006)

Actor
Hatchet (2006) (Jack Cracker)
Hatchet II (2010) (Jack Cracker)

References

External links

1952 births
2019 deaths
Male actors from Illinois
American male film actors
Place of death missing
American film producers
American screenwriters
American make-up artists
People from Belleville, Illinois
Special effects people
Film directors from Illinois
Deaths from prostate cancer
Deaths from cancer in the United States